The 2013 Kazakhstan Cup is the 22nd season of the Kazakhstan Cup, the annual nationwide football cup competition of Kazakhstan since the independence of the country. The competition begins on 10 April 2013 and will end with the final in November 2013. Astana are the defending champions, having won their second cup in the 2012 competition.

The winner of the competition will qualify for the first qualifying round of the 2014–15 UEFA Europa League.

First round
The draw was conducted on 2013 at the offices of the Football Federation of Kazakhstan. Entering this round are 30 clubs from both the 2013 Premier League and First Division seasons. The matches took place on 10 April 2013.

|colspan="3" style="background-color:#97DEFF"|10 April 2013

|}

Second round
Entering this round are the 14 winners from the First Round and the finalists of last year FC Astana and FC Irtysh Pavlodar. The matches took place on 1 May 2013.

|colspan="3" style="background-color:#97DEFF"|1 May 2013

|-
|colspan="3" style="background-color:#97DEFF"|2 May 2013

|}

Quarter-final 
Entering this round are the 8 winners from the Second Round. The matches took place on 19 June 2013.

|colspan="3" style="background-color:#97DEFF"|19 June 2013

|}

Semi-final 
Entering this round of the competition were the four winners from the quarter-final. The first legs are on 25 September 2013, the return games - on 30 October 2013.

|}

Final

External links 
 Official site

References 

2013
Cup
2013 domestic association football cups